Ordu Kabul F.C. is a football team based in Kabul, Afghanistan. The club competes in Kabul Premier League. Ordu FC became champions twice, in 2006 and 2007. In 2009, the team got a new ground, Melat Stadium.

Current squad
As of 2 May 2021

Achievements

Domestic
Afghanistan Premier League
Winner (1): 2007
Runners-up (1): 2008

References

Football clubs in Afghanistan
Sport in Kabul